Caliente (Hot) is a television music series that aired on Univision from April 8, 1995, to March 11, 2006, with 417 episodes. It was hosted by Charlie Bravo and Diana Franco, until Rafael Mercadante took over on March 1, 2003. It could be described as a sort of Latin Soul Train. Caliente featured some of the biggest names in Latin music including live segments from Celia Cruz and Daddy Yankee. The show was mostly shot in Miami, Florida, but the show also made tapings in New York, Chicago, Los Angeles, Puerto Rico, Mexico, the Dominican Republic and others.

Episode list airdate
January 17, 1998: Las Vegas, NV
October 31, 1998: Miami, FL
September 11, 1999: San Antonio, TX
February 5, 2000: Acapulco, Mexico
March 11, 2000: Puerto Vallarta, Mexico
March 18, 2000: Miami, FL
August 12, 2000: Boston, MA
September 2, 2000: Dominican Republic
October 7, 2000: Puerto Rico
June 20, 2001: Malibu, CA
July 7, 2001: Key West, FL
July 21, 2001: Redondo Beach, CA
August 4, 2001: Las Vegas
August 18, 2001: Corpus Christi, TX
October 6, 2001: Sacramento, CA
October 20, 2001: Santa Monica, CA
October 27, 2001: Miami, FL
November 3, 2001: Miami, FL
January 5, 2002: Dominican Republic
January 19, 2002: Hawaii
May 3, 2002: Miami, FL
August 10, 2002: Mar del Plata, Argentina
October 5, 2002: NYC
November 16, 2002: Cancun, Mexico
January 25, 2003: Orlando, FL
September 20, 2003: Redondo Beach, CA
September 25, 2004: Albuquerque, NM
May 28, 2005: Acapulco, Mexico
July 9, 2005: Santa Clara, CA
November 5, 2005: Chicago, IL
August 23, 2010: San Fernando Rock And Blood Fest, Tamaulipas, Mexico

Killer Tracks music cue
New Jack Swing by John Hobbs - Chica Caliente
Shuffle Bump by John Hobbs - Chica Caliente
Charomatic Sting by John Hobbs - Video Caliente
Igor's Comic Capers by Larry Wolff - Chiste Caliente
Zip & Cindy by Steve Kujala - Chiste Caliente
Live on Stage by Al Capps - Caliente en Vivo
E.T. Teeny Bopper by Larry Wolff
73' Soul Injection by Al Capps
Kentucky Fried Piano by John Hobbs and Steve Stone
Sock Hop by John Hobbs and Steve Stone - Caliente Intro
Cuban Cuisine by John Hobbs
Pica Pica! by John Hobbs
The Way She Walks by Al Capps
Amanece en Isla Verde by Jorge Calandrelli - Caliente Cortesia
Noogies by Al Capps
Dusky Wine by Al Capps
Chicago Shuffle by John Hobbs
Island Groove by Jonathan Merrill
Bahamian Party by Danny Pelfrey, Rick Rhodes and Terry Lester

DVD release
Univision Networks currently has no plans to release the music show on DVD at this time.

Univision original programming
1995 American television series debuts
2006 American television series endings
1990s American music television series
2000s American music television series